African Democratic Change (ADeC) is a South African political party.  It was launched on 1 December 2017 by former African National Congress Member of Parliament, Makhosi Khoza. Khoza resigned from the party in April 2018. The party is currently led by Visvin Reddy.

Formation
Makhosi Khoza resigned as an African National Congress Member of Parliament on 21 September 2017 to join the effort against corruption in South Africa. Her resignation came after months of her criticizing ANC President Jacob Zuma and calling for him to step down. After the announcement, it became speculative that Khoza would form a new political party. Initial reports in November 2017, suggested that Khoza would name her new political party "Change". The African Democratic Change (ADeC) was launched on 1 December 2017. Khoza was adamant that her new party would not collapse.

After the launch, the African National Congress criticized Khoza for making the ADeC logo look similar to the African National Congress logo. Khoza dismissed these claims.

In April 2018, four months after the launch of the party, Khoza stepped down as party leader. Party chairperson, Moses Mayekiso, succeeded her as leader.

Election results
The party contested the 2019 South African general election on the national and provincial ballot, and entered into a partnership with the Dagga Party.

It failed to win any seats.

The party is contesting the 2021 South African municipal elections. In October 2021, it suspended one of its candidates, Wayne Solomon, after a voice note surfaced of him discussing sexual acts with minor girls, aged six, nine and sixteen.

National elections

|-
! Election
! Total votes
! Share of vote
! Seats 
! +/–
! Government
|-
! 2019
| 6,499
| 0.04%
| 
| –
| 
|}

Provincial elections

! rowspan=2 | Election
! colspan=2 | Eastern Cape
! colspan=2 | Free State
! colspan=2 | Gauteng
! colspan=2 | Kwazulu-Natal
! colspan=2 | Limpopo
! colspan=2 | Mpumalanga
! colspan=2 | North-West
! colspan=2 | Northern Cape
! colspan=2 | Western Cape
|-
! % !! Seats
! % !! Seats
! % !! Seats
! % !! Seats
! % !! Seats
! % !! Seats
! % !! Seats
! % !! Seats
! % !! Seats
|-
! 2019
| - || -
| 0.38% || 0/30
| 0.02% || 0/73
| - || -
| - || -
| - || -
| - || -
| - || -
| - || -
|}

References

2017 establishments in South Africa
Anti-corruption parties
Political parties established in 2017
Political parties in South Africa
African National Congress breakaway groups